Hans-Jürgen Klein (born 21 May 1952 in Recke) is a German politician for the Alliance '90/The Greens.

He was elected to the Lower Saxon Landtag in 1998, and has been re-elected on two occasions.

References

1952 births
Living people
Alliance 90/The Greens politicians
Members of the Landtag of Lower Saxony